Liosomadoras morrowi is a species of driftwood catfish endemic to Peru where it is found in the Ucayali River.

References
 

Auchenipteridae
Freshwater fish of Peru
Fish described in 1940